The 2017 WSBL season was the 29th season of the Women's State Basketball League (SBL). The regular season began on Friday 17 March, with Perry Lakes, East Perth and Rockingham hosting Stirling, Kalamunda and Perth respectively. The 2017 WSBL All-Star Game was played on 5 June at Bendat Basketball Centre – the home of basketball in Western Australia. The regular season ended on Saturday 29 July. The finals began on Friday 4 August and ended on Friday 1 September, when the Perry Lakes Hawks defeated the Mandurah Magic in the WSBL Grand Final.

Regular season
The regular season began on Friday 17 March and ended on Saturday 29 July after 20 rounds of competition. In an exciting move by the SBL, all games over the Easter Weekend were played on a blockbuster Thursday night with six venues all hosting games before the league took a break for the Easter long weekend. Anzac Round took place again in round 6 of the competition with the Kalamunda Eastern Suns and Willetton Tigers continuing their Anzac Day game tradition while being joined this year by the Cockburn Cougars hosting the Rockingham Flames on the Tuesday afternoon. In round 9, the inaugural Women's Round took place in alignment with Mother's Day on Sunday 14 May. During this round, the SBL trialled the WSBL games being played at the later timeslot at each venue following the MSBL games. There was also Rivalry Round in round 12 and Heritage Round in round 16.

Standings

Finals
The finals began on Friday 4 August and ended on Friday 1 September with the WSBL Grand Final.

Bracket

All-Star Game
The 2017 WSBL All-Star Game took place at Bendat Basketball Centre on Monday 5 June, with all proceeds going to Lifeline WA for suicide prevention.

Rosters

Game data

Awards

Player of the Week

Statistics leaders

Regular season
 Most Valuable Player: Alison Schwagmeyer (Lakeside Lightning)
 Coach of the Year: Randy Miegel (Mandurah Magic)
 Most Improved Player: Chelsea Belcher (Joondalup Wolves)
 All-Star Five:
 PG: Nici Gilday (Mandurah Magic)
 SG: Stacey Barr (Willetton Tigers)
 SF: Alison Schwagmeyer (Lakeside Lightning)
 PF: Carly Boag (Mandurah Magic)
 C: Natalie Burton (Perry Lakes Hawks)
 All-Defensive Five:
 PG: Lauren Jeffers (Perry Lakes Hawks)
 SG: Casey Mihovilovich (Mandurah Magic)
 SF: Alison Schwagmeyer (Lakeside Lightning)
 PF: Ellyce Ironmonger (Joondalup Wolves)
 C: Natalie Burton (Perry Lakes Hawks)

Finals
 Grand Final MVP: Antonia Farnworth (Perry Lakes Hawks)

References

External links
 2017 fixtures
 2017 season preview
 2017 WSBL All-Star teams
 State basketball a first for Northam
 SBL Quarter Finals Schedule Released
 WSBL Grand Final preview

2017
2016–17 in Australian basketball
2017–18 in Australian basketball
basketball